The Holy Bible: A Translation From the Latin Vulgate in the Light of the Hebrew and Greek Originals is a Catholic version of the Bible in three volumes (later published in one volume editions) translated by Monsignor Ronald Knox, the English theologian, priest and crime writer. It is more commonly known as the Knox Bible or Knox Version.

Later editions
Templegate Publishers produced a facsimile of the New Testament in 1997.

Baronius Press secured the rights for the work from the Archdiocese of Westminster in 2009 and their new leather-bound edition of Monsignor Knox's translation was published in October 2012. A hardcover version was also published.

The Anglican Archbishop of Canterbury, Rowan Williams, commented on the new Baronius Press edition that "Ronald Knox's translation of the Bible remains an exceptional achievement both of scholarship and of literary dedication. Again and again it successfully avoids conventional options and gives the scriptural text a fresh flavour, often with a brilliantly idiosyncratic turn of phrase. It most certainly deserves republication, study and use."

See also

 Catholic Bible

References

External links
 Knox Bible, fully searchable, including all references and possible to compare with both the Latin Vulgate and Douay Rheims Bibles side by side.
 Text at New Advent with the Septuagint, Westcott-Hort and Vulgate in parallel columns
 Title pages to first editions of Knox Translation

1950 books
Bible translations into English
Catholic bibles